The Love Girl is a 1916 American silent comedy film directed by Robert Z. Leonard and starring Ella Hall, Adele Farrington and Kingsley Benedict.

Cast
 Ella Hall as Ambrosia
 Adele Farrington as Ambrosia's Aunt Betty
 Kingsley Benedict as Betty's Sweetheart
 Betty Schade as Ambrosia's Cousin
 Harry Depp as The Boy Next Door
 Grace Marvin as The Maid
 Wadsworth Harris as The Swami

References

Bibliography
 Langman, Larry. American Film Cycles: The Silent Era. Greenwood Publishing, 1998.

External links
 

1916 films
1916 comedy films
1910s English-language films
American silent feature films
Silent American comedy films
American black-and-white films
Films directed by Robert Z. Leonard
Universal Pictures films
1910s American films